The Archambault Coco is a French sailboat that was designed by Harlé - Mortain as a Classe Mini racer for racing in the Mini Transat 6.50. It was first built in 1985.

Production
The design was built by Archambault Boats of Dangé-Saint-Romain, France, with 110 boats completed between 1985 and 2002, but it is now out of production. Archambault, which had been founded in 1967, went out of business in 2015.

Design
The Coco is a racing keelboat, built predominantly of fibreglass. It has a fractional sloop rig. The hull has a plumb stem, a reverse transom, a skeg-mounted rudder controlled by a tiller and a fixed fin keel. It displaces  and carries  of ballast.

Operational history

The major race run for this class of sailboats is the Mini Transat 6.50, a solo transatlantic yacht race, that typically starts in France and ends in Le Marin, Martinique in the Caribbean.

See also
List of sailing boat types

References

External links
Video: Sailing the Coco
Video: Coco sails and rigging

Keelboats
1980s sailboat type designs
Sailing yachts
Sailboat type designs by Harlé - Mortain
Sailboat types built by Archambault Boats